is a Japanese fashion model and actress who is affiliated with Horipro.

Biography
In 2005, Nakabeppu won the 30th Horipro Tarento Scout Caravan Quasi Grand Prix award, and debuted in the entertainment industry in the wake.

In 2006, she had been an exclusive model in the fashion magazine Mina.

In 2008, Nakabeppu was elected in the 2008 level of Toray Girl Swimsuit Campaign. At the time, she was belonged to Toray's women's volleyball team and met Saori Kimura and made friends.

On March 24, 2009, Nakabeppu graduated from Sunrise High School. She was synchronized with people such as Kie Kitano and Natsumi Kiyoura.

Nakabeppu also had a good relationship with Mitsuki Tanimura.

On April 1, 2009, she was enrolled to Meiji Gakuin University's Department of Sociology.

In April 2013, Nakabeppu became a member of Tokyo Girls Run's second graduating class.

Filmography

Television

Film

References

External links
 Official profile at Horipro 
 Official profile at Tokyo Girls Run 

Japanese female models
Japanese gravure models
21st-century Japanese actresses
1990 births
Living people
Actors from Kumamoto Prefecture
Models from Kumamoto Prefecture